The Liberating Expedition of Peru was a naval and land military force created in 1820 by the government of Chile in continuation of the plan of the Argentine General José de San Martín to achieve the independence of Peru, and thus consolidate the independence of all former Spanish-American colonies. It was vital to defeat the Viceroyalty of Peru—the center of royalist power in South America—from where royalist expeditions were sent to reconquer the territories lost to the independence fighters.

Following the independence of Chile, achieved at the Battle of Maipú, General San Martín determined to achieve the independence of Peru. Accordingly, on February 5, 1819, a treaty was signed between the new Republic of Chile and the United Provinces of the Río de la Plata. The treaty was to create an amphibious, naval, and land military expeditionary force promoted by the government of Chile, with the mission of making Peru independent of the Spanish Empire and consolidating both the sovereignty of the new Republic of Chile and that of the United Provinces of the Río de la Plata, which became Argentina.

The parties to the treaty faced ongoing problems which hampered the launch of their liberating campaign. Chile was under imminent threat of further Spanish invasions, while the United Provinces of the Río de la Plata were in turmoil over internal disputes. It was finally negotiated that the bulk of the effort and initial cost would essentially fall on the Government of Chile, and then the costs expended were to be borne by the future independent government of Peru. Bernardo O'Higgins, as Supreme Director of Chile, appointed José de San Martín chief of the United Liberation Army of Chile and the former British Naval officer, the Scot, Thomas, Lord Cochrane, commander of the naval fleet. In this way, the Liberating Army of Peru, thus named by supreme decree of the Congress of Chile, on May 19, 1820, was a combined force of units of the restored Chilean Army along with those elements belonging to the Liberating Army of the Andes, that had fought in the Peruvian War of Independence.

The rebellion of Rafael del Riego of 1820 in Spain, made the threat of Spanish invasion of the Río de la Plata recede. The vice-admiral, Lord Cochrane, would succeed in sweeping away the remnants of Spanish naval power in the Pacific Ocean. These events allowed the land forces of General San Martín to embark in Valparaíso, disembark at Paracas Bay on September 8, occupy the city of Lima, and proclaim the independence of Peru on July 28, 1821.

The expedition liberated parts of Peru from Spanish Crown control. It would participate in the expeditions of Juan Antonio Álvarez de Arenales in the highlands of Peru and the campaigns of intermediate ports, and would remain in Peru until its dissolution with the mutiny of 1824 at the second siege of Callao. The remnants of the expeditionary force were added to the units of the Army of Peru and the United Liberation Army of Peru, under the command of Simón Bolívar, which would complete the liberation of Peru.

Maitland Plan

According to Argentine historians like Felipe Pigna and Rodolfo Terragno, José de San Martín was introduced to the plan during his stay in London in 1811 by members of the Logia Lautaro: a Freemasonic Lodge founded by Francisco de Miranda and Scottish Lord MacDuff (James Duff, 4th Earl Fife). San Martín was allegedly part of the lodge, and he took the Maitland Plan as a blueprint for the movements necessary to defeat the Spanish army in Chile and Peru; he carried on successfully with the last five points of the plan, and thus liberated the southern part of the continent.

Background
Between 1812 and 1814 the General Captaincy of Chile was reconquered by José Fernando de Abascal y Sousa, Viceroy of Perú, which ended in the Disaster of Rancagua, putting an end to the Patria Vieja (Old Homeland) period, in which the Chilean patriots had governed the majority of the colony and formulated notable reforms to the colonial Spanish diet. After the disaster, the Chilean troops, along with the representatives of the government, fled to Mendoza, where they were received by the governor of the province of Cuyo, General José de San Martín, who then concocted a plan of liberation of the South American colonies of the Spanish Empire. The plan would consist of invading Chile with an army composed largely of the remains of the Army of Chile, defeated in Rancagua, as well as Argentine troops. After the invasion and liberation of Chile, they would embark by sea to Peru to eliminate the Spanish presence in that region, since they were considered a big threat for the independence of other Latin Americans countries.

The emancipation of Perú was to have been a common enterprise by Chile and Argentina. Argentina, then a loose alliance of provinces, distracted by internal strife and another threat of invasion from Spain, was unable to contribute for the expedition and ordered José de San Martín back to Argentina. San Martín choose to disobey (see Acta de Rancagua) and O'Higgins decided that Chile would assume the costs of the Freedom Expedition of Perú.

The Squadron

On 20 August 1820 the expedition sailed from Valparaíso for Paracas, near Pisco in Perú. The escort was provided by the squadron and consisted of the flagship O'Higgins (under Captain Thomas Sackville Crosbie), frigate San Martín (Captain William Wilkinson), frigate Lautaro (Captain Martin Guise), the corvette Independencia (Captain Robert Forster), the brigs Galvarino (Captain John Tooker Spry), Araucano (Captain Thomas Carter), and Pueyrredón (Lieutenant William Prunier) and the schooner Moctezuma (Lieutenant George Young).

Every expeditionary ship got a painted number so that it could be identified at a distance. There are discrepancies between authors about the names and number and some names of the transports.

On 8 September 1820 the liberating army disembarked 100 miles southeast of Lima: of the 4118 soldiers, 4000 of them were Chileans.

On the night of 5 November, Cochrane personally and 240 volunteers wearing white with blue armbands captured the Spanish frigate Esmeralda within the port of Callao. She was renamed Valdivia and commissioned into the Chilean Navy.

References

External links

Battles involving Chile
Battles involving Spain
Battles involving Argentina
1820 in the Spanish Empire
1820 in Peru
Conflicts in 1820
Battles of the Peruvian War of Independence